Khotta may refer to:

 Khotta people, an Indo-Aryan community in eastern India
 Khotta language, the language spoken by the Khotta people

See also
 Khortha language